The 1937 Richmond-upon-Thames by-election was held on 25 February 1937.  The by-election was held due to the resignation of the incumbent Conservative MP, William Ray.  It was won by the Conservative candidate George Harvie-Watt.

References

Richmond-upon-Thames by-election
Richmond-upon-Thames,1937
Richmond-upon-Thames,1937
Richmond-upon-Thames,1937
Richmond-upon-Thames by-election
20th century in Surrey